The Presbyterian Church in Korea (BoSuTongHap) was founded by Pastor Chung Yun-Sung in 1976 together with Baek Kee. Previously they participated in the reconstruction of the Presbyterian Church in Korea (JungAng), but criticised the denomination. The BoSuJaeJung was formed. In 1985 a new seminary was founded. The BoSuJaeJung merged with other denominations and formed the BoSuTongHap. In 2004 it had 6,000 members and 102 congregations. It subscribes the Apostles Creed and the Westminster Confession.

References 

Presbyterian denominations in South Korea
Presbyterian denominations in Asia